BD1018 or (S)-2-[2-(3,4-dichlorophenyl)ethyl]octahydropyrrolo[1,2-a]pyrazine is a selective sigma receptor ligand, with a reported binding affinity of Ki = 5 ± 0.7 nM for the sigma-1 receptor and approximately 10 times selectivity over the sigma-2 receptor. Unlike its enantiomer, BD1031, BD1018 acts as a sigma receptor antagonist.

Consistent with other reported sigma receptor antagonists, BD1018 decreases the behavioural toxicity of cocaine in Swiss Webster mice.

See also

 BD1008
 BD1031

References

Ligands (biochemistry)